Kushkot is a village in Achham District in the Seti Zone of western Nepal. At the time of the 1991 Nepal census, the village had a population of 3138 living in 600 houses. At the time of the 2001 Nepal census, the population was 3741, of which 28% was literate. At the time of the 2011 Nepal census, Kushkot counted 4654 inhabitants.

References

Populated places in Achham District
Village development committees in Achham District